Amaurobiidae is a family of three-clawed cribellate or ecribellate spiders found in crevices and hollows or under stones where they build retreats, and are often collected in pitfall traps. Unlidded burrows are sometimes quite obvious in crusty, loamy soil. They are difficult to distinguish from related spiders in other families, especially Agelenidae, Desidae and Amphinectidae. Their intra- and interfamilial relationships are contentious. According to the World Spider Catalog, 2023, the family Amaurobiidae includes 286 species in 50 genera.

In Australia, they are small to medium-sized entelegyne spiders with minimal sheet webs. They are fairly common in Tasmania and nearby mainland Australia in cooler rainforest, some in caves. They are widespread but uncommon along the eastern coastline. They generally have eight similar eyes in two conservatively curved rows. They often have a calamistrum on metatarsus IV associated with a cribellum. Australian amaurobiids may be distinguished from the Amphinectidae by the absence of a pretarsal fracture and the presence of a retrocoxal hymen on coxa I.

Reorganization
This family has lost and gained several genera resulting from wide-ranging DNA analysis of spider families. It lost Bakala and Manjala to Desidae, while Toxopidae took in Midgee and the monotypic genus Jamara. In return, it gained some of Australia's medium-sized brown spiders in the former family Amphinectidae, including Tasmabrochus, Tasmarubrius, and Teeatta), all of which are common in Tasmania and mainland Australia.

Genera

, the World Spider Catalog accepts the following genera:

Altellopsis Simon, 1905 — Argentina
Amaurobius C. L. Koch, 1837 — North America, South America, Europe, Africa, Georgia, Micronesia
Anisacate Mello-Leitão, 1941 — Argentina, Chile
Arctobius Lehtinen, 1967 — United States, Canada, Russia
Auhunga Forster & Wilton, 1973 — New Zealand
Auximella Strand, 1908 — Ecuador, Brazil, Peru
Callevopsis Tullgren, 1902 — Chile, Argentina
Callobius Chamberlin, 1947 — North America, Bulgaria, Asia
Cavernocymbium Ubick, 2005 — United States
Chresiona Simon, 1903 — South Africa
Chumma Jocqué, 2001 — South Africa, Lesotho
Cybaeopsis Strand, 1907 — North America, Asia
Dardurus Davies, 1976 — Australia
Daviesa Koçak & Kemal, 2008 — Australia
Ecurobius Zamani & Marusik, 2021 — Iran
Emmenomma Simon, 1884 — Argentina, Chile
Hicanodon Tullgren, 1901 — Chile, Argentina
Himalmartensus Wang & Zhu, 2008 — Nepal, India
Livius Roth, 1967 — Chile
Macrobunus Tullgren, 1901 — Chile, Argentina, South Africa
Malenella Ramírez, 1995 — Chile
Maloides Forster & Wilton, 1989 — New Zealand
Muritaia Forster & Wilton, 1973 — New Zealand
Naevius Roth, 1967 — Argentina, Peru, Bolivia
Neoporteria Mello-Leitão, 1943 — Chile
Neuquenia Mello-Leitão, 1940 — Argentina
Obatala Lehtinen, 1967 — South Africa
Otira Forster & Wilton, 1973 — New Zealand
Ovtchinnikovia Marusik, Kovblyuk & Ponomarev, 2010
Oztira Milledge, 2011 — Australia
Parazanomys Ubick, 2005 — United States
Pimus Chamberlin, 1947 — United States
Pseudauximus Simon, 1902 — South Africa
Retiro Mello-Leitão, 1915 — South America, Costa Rica
Rhoicinaria Exline, 1950 — Colombia, Ecuador
Rubrius Simon, 1887 — Chile, Argentina
Storenosoma Hogg, 1900 — Australia
Taira Lehtinen, 1967 — China, Japan
Tasmabrochus Davies, 2002 — Australia
Tasmarubrius Davies, 1998 — Australia
Teeatta Davies, 2005 — Australia
Tugana Chamberlin, 1948 — Cuba
Tymbira Mello-Leitão, 1944 — Argentina
Urepus Roth, 1967 — Peru
Virgilus Roth, 1967 — Ecuador
Wabarra Davies, 1996 — Australia
Waitetola Forster & Wilton, 1973 — New Zealand
Yacolla Lehtinen, 1967 — Brazil
Yupanquia Lehtinen, 1967 — Argentina
Zanomys Chamberlin, 1948 — United States, Canada

See also
 List of Amaurobiidae species

References

External links 

 Narrated Video of A. fenestralis
 Video of Amaurobiid from Ireland

 
Araneomorphae families